Gerard Joseph Malanga (born March 20, 1943) is an American poet, photographer, filmmaker, actor, curator and archivist.

Early life

Malanga was born in the Bronx in 1943, the only child of Italian immigrant parents. In 1959, at the beginning of his senior year at the School of Industrial Art in Manhattan, Malanga became a regular on Alan Freed's The Big Beat, televised on Channel 5 (WNEW) in New York City. He graduated from high school with a major in Advertising Design (1960). He was introduced to poetry by his senior class English teacher, poet Daisy Aldan, who had a profound influence on his life and work from then on. He enrolled at the University of Cincinnati's College of Art & Design (1960), and was mentored by the poet Richard Eberhart, who was the university's resident poet for 1961. He dropped out at the end of the Spring semester. In the fall of 1961, Malanga was admitted to Wagner College in Staten Island on a fellowship anonymously donated for the express purpose of advancing his creative abilities as a poet and artist. At Wagner he befriended one of his English professors, Willard Maas, and his wife Marie Menken, who became his mentors. In June 1963, he went to work for Andy Warhol as "a summer job that lasted seven years," as he likes to put it. Malanga dropped out of Wagner College in 1964, freeing him up to work for Warhol full-time.

Andy Warhol and The Factory
Malanga worked closely with Andy Warhol during Warhol's most creative period, from 1963 to 1970. A February 17, 1992 article in The New York Times referred to him as "Andy Warhol's most important associate." Malanga was introduced to Warhol through Charles Henri Ford.

Malanga was involved in all phases of Warhol's creative output in silkscreen painting and filmmaking. He acted in many of the early Warhol films, including Kiss (1963), Harlot (1964), Soap Opera (1964), Couch (1964), Vinyl (1965), Camp (1965), Chelsea Girls (1966); and co-produced Bufferin (1967) in which he reads his poetry, deemed to be the longest spoken-word movie on record at 33-minutes nonstop. Malanga played a combination of Lee Harvey Oswald and Jack Ruby in Warhol's film Since (1966). Also in 1966, he choreographed the music of the Velvet Underground for Warhol's multimedia presentation, The Exploding Plastic Inevitable. In 1969, Malanga was one of the founding editors, along with Warhol and John Wilcock, of Interview magazine. In December 1970, Malanga left Warhol's studio to pursue his work in photography.

Creative practice

Malanga and Warhol collaborated on the nearly five-hundred individual 3-minute "Screen Tests," which resulted in a selection for a book of the same name, published by Kulchur Press, in 1967. Neither Warhol or Malanga were photographers at the time. Thus, by virtue of their collaboration with the motion picture medium, creating in what amounted to post-photographs, they became professional photographers.

Malanga's photography spans over four decades and encompasses portraits, nudes and the urban documentation of "New York's Changing Scene," a phrase which he adapted from Margot Gayle, an architectural historian and advocate, whose Sunday News column of the same name had a direct bearing on the development of his photographic eye.

Malanga has always sought someone who was rarely photographed or placed in situations and surroundings unique to the pictures he was shooting. Within the first six years of taking pictures he managed to create three of the most prominent portraits of post-modern photography: Charles Olson for the interview he made with Olson for The Paris Review (1969); Iggy Pop nude in the penthouse apartment they shared one summer weekend (1971); and William Burroughs in front of the corporate headquarters that bears his family name (1975). All in all, he has photographed and archived hundreds of poets and artists over the years. He is also a photographer of a number of firsts, including Herbert Gericke, the last farmer of Staten Island (1981); and Jack Kerouac's typewritten roll for On the Road (1983).

In his introduction to Malanga's first monograph, Resistance to Memory (Arena Editions, 1998), Ben Maddow, distinguished photo historian and poet had this to say: "Malanga has that great essential virtue of the photographer: humility before the complex splendor of the real thing… Malanga is the photo-historian of this culture."

In reviewing Malanga's groundbreaking book two years later, Screen Tests Portraits Nudes 1964-1996 (Steidl), Fred McDarrah remarked that "Malanga is among the elite editors and photographers who have long dazzled and propelled the New York avant garde."

During the course of his years working with Warhol and after, Malanga shot and produced twelve films of his own. His personal archive contains still and motion-picture records of life at The Factory.

Works

Poetry 
Screen Tests: A Diary (with Andy Warhol) (1967)
The Last Benedetta Poems (1969)
Gerard Malanga Selbsporträt eines Dichters (1970)
10 Poems for 10 Poets Black Sparrow Press (1970)
chic death (1971)
Wheels of Light (1972)
The Poetry of Night, Dawn and Dream/Nine Poems for César Vallejo (1972)
Licht/Light (1973, bilingual)
Incarnations: Poems 1965-1971 (1974)
Rosebud (1975)
Leaping Over Gravestones (1976)
Ten Years After: The Selected Benedetta Poems (1977)
100 years have passed (1978)
This Will Kill That (1983)
Three Diamonds Black Sparrow Press (1991)
Mythologies of the Heart, Black Sparrow Press (1996)
No Respect: New & Selected Poems 1964-2000, Black Sparrow Press (2001)
AM: Archives Malanga, Volumes 1, 2, 3 & 4 (2011)
Three Broadside Poems, Bottle of Smoke Press (2013)
Malanga Chasing Vallejo: Selected Poems: Cesar Vallejo: New Translations and Notes: Gerard Malanga. Three Rooms Press, Bilingual edition (2014)Tomboy & Other Tales, Bottle of Smoke Press (2014)Whisper Sweet Nothings & Other Poems, Bottle of Smoke Press (2017)Cool & Other Poems, Bottle of Smoke Press (2019)

EditorThe Brief Hidden Life of Angus MacLiseThe Collected Poetry of Piero Heliczer Photography Screen Tests/A Diary, in collaboration with Andy Warhol (1967)Six Portraits (1975)Portrait: Theory (With Robert Mapplethorpe, David Attie, and others) (1981)Autobiography of a Sex Thief (1985)Good Girls (1994)Seizing the Moment (1997)Resistance to Memory (1998)Screen Tests Portraits Nudes 1964-1996 (2000)Someone's Life (2008)Photobooths (Waverly Press, NYC, 2013)Ghostly Berms (Waverly Press, NYC, 2013)Julien Mérieau, Astonish me! / étonnez-moi! (Warm, 2016)        The Beats Portfolio (Bottle of Smoke Press, 2018)

Photo and written biographiesLong Day's Journey into the Past: Gunnar B. Kvaran speaks with Gerard Malanga (2008)Souls (2010)Gerard Malanga by Lars Movin (2011)

FilmsAcademy Leader (1964)Twice a Man (1964)Andy Warhol: Portraits of the Artist as a Young Man (1965)Prelude to International Velvet Debutante (1966)Portrait of Giangiacomo Feltrinelli (1966). World premiere: Vienna International Film Festival, 2005.In Search of the Miraculous (1967)The Recording Zone Operator (1968, incomplete)The filmmaker records a portion of his life in the month of August (1968)Preraphaelite Dream (with music by Angus MacLise, 1968)The Children (AFI grant with music by Angus MacLise, 1969)April Diary (1970)Vision (incorporating Bufferin, 1976)Gerard Malanga's Film Notebooks, with music by Angus MacLise (2005). World premiere: Vienna International Film Festival, 2005.

MusicTHREE weeks WITH my DOG with 48 Cameras (1999)Angus MacLise'', The Cloud Doctrine produced by Gerard Malanga (w/ Guy Marc Hinant), 2003.

References

External links 
 
 Publisher's Author Page http://www.bospress.net/gerardmalanga.html]
 
2018 Interview, Loud Alien Noize
2002 Interview, 3:AM Magazine
2004 Interview, Rain Taxi Review of Books
2009 Interview, Smithsonian Magazine 
 2011 Interview, The Poetry Foundation
 2011 Interview, The Paris Review
 Michael Limnios interviews Gerard Malanga (2013).
 Guide to the Gerard Malanga Papers, Beinecke Rare Book and Manuscript Library, Yale University.
 A Purchase in the White Botanica: The Collected Poetry of Piero Heliczer, (2001) , Granary Books.
Official Facebook web site https://www.facebook.com/GerardMalangaOfficial/
Gerard Malanga Papers. Yale Collection of American Literature, Beinecke Rare Book and Manuscript Library.

1943 births
Living people
Male actors from New York City
American male film actors
American photographers
American male poets
American poets of Italian descent
American filmmakers
American archivists
People from the Bronx
Wagner College alumni
High School of Art and Design alumni
American spoken word poets
Musicians from New York City
The Velvet Underground
Poets from New York (state)
People associated with The Factory